The Khonghampat Orchidarium is a botanical garden in Imphal, Manipur, India. It is dedicated to the collection, cultivation, preservation and display of a wide range of 500 varieties of orchids found in Manipur. It houses some of the rarest orchids in the world. The peak blooming season of the orchid flowers is from April to July. The finest visiting season is March to April. This Orchidarium is the orchid centre of the Forest Department of Manipur.

History 
The Khonghampat Orchidarium was founded by the Manipur Forest Department in the year 1976.

Features 
The Khonghampat Orchidarium covers an area of 200 acres of land.

Predominant genuses of the orchid species grown in the orchidarium include Vanda, Dendrobium and Rhynchostylis. A few of the species are the following:

See also 
 Imphal Peace Museum
 INA War Museum
 Kakching Garden
 Keibul Lamjao National Park - world's only floating national park in Manipur, India
 Loktak Folklore Museum
 Manipur State Museum
 Manipur Zoological Garden
 Phumdi - Floating biomasses in Manipur, India
 Sekta Archaeological Living Museum
 Yangoupokpi-Lokchao Wildlife Sanctuary

References 

Botanical gardens in India
Imphal
Orchid organizations
1976 establishments in Manipur